Norwegian Narcotic Officers Association (NNOA;) is a Norwegian lobbying organization. The organization is primarily advocating for a strict drug enforcement law retaining punishment as a reaction to illegal drug use, only excluding punishment for people suffering from severe substance use disorder. It has distinguished itself as opponents of drug liberalization.

It was established in November 1991 as an attempt to prevent and reduce organized crime related to illegal drugs. As of January 2023, senior police constable Jan Erik Bresil is the leader of the organization, and state attorney Geir Evanger functions as the deputy chairman.

References

External links 

 

Drug control law
Non-profit organisations based in Norway
1991 establishments in Norway
Political organizations established in 1991
Opposition to cannabis legalization
Temperance organizations